Top Christian Albums is a weekly chart published in Billboard magazine that ranks the best-performing Christian albums in the United States. Like the Billboard 200, the data is compiled by Nielsen Soundscan based on each album's weekly physical and digital sales, as well as on-demand streaming and digital sales of its individual tracks. The chart was introduced on the magazine issue dated March 29, 1980, under the title "Best Selling Inspirational LPs". The current name was adopted on August 16, 2003, in an effort to "streamline" chart titles. The first number-one album was Candle's Music Machine. Amy Grant's Age to Age, released in 1982, topped the chart for 85 consecutive weeks, the longest for any album on the chart.

As of the issue dated March 18, 2023, the number-one album is Donda by Kanye West.

Artist milestones

Most number-one albums

Most cumulative weeks at number one

Album milestones

Most cumulative weeks at number one
The following albums have spent at least 30 cumulative weeks atop the chart:

Most consecutive weeks at number one
The following albums have spent at least 25 consecutive weeks atop the chart:

Most weeks on the chart
The following albums have spent at least 200 weeks on the chart:

Number ones

See also 
 Christian Songs
 Official Christian & Gospel Albums Chart

References

External links 
 

Christian Albums
Contemporary Christian music